Saint-Paul-en-Cornillon is a commune in the Loire department in central France.

Population

Gallery

See also
Communes of the Loire department

References

Communes of Loire (department)